Korutürk is a Turkish surname. It may refer to.

Emel Korutürk (1915–2013), Turkish painter and First Lady of Turkey
Fahri Korutürk (1903–1987), Turkish navy officer, diplomat and sixth President of Turkey
Zergün Korutürk (born 1948), Turkish diplomat and ambassador

Turkish-language surnames